Partial general elections were held in Belgium on 13 June 1876. In the elections for the Chamber of Representatives the result was a victory for the Catholic Party, which won 67 of the 124 seats. Voter turnout was 67.5%, although only 63,278 people were eligible to vote.

Under the alternating system, elections were only held in five out of the nine provinces: Antwerp, Brabant, Luxembourg, Namur and West Flanders.

Additionally, special elections were held:
 Simultaneously with the partial general elections to elect a representative for the arrondissement of Liège
 On 7 August 1876 to elect a representative for the arrondissement of Leuven following the death of Edouard Wouters on 13 July 1876
 On 7 September 1876 to elect a representative for the arrondissement of Virton replacing Albert de Briey

Results

Chamber of Representatives

References

1870s elections in Belgium
General
Belgium
Belgium